Henry Paddack  (April 2, 1838 – 1920)  was an American businessman and politician who served as the Treasurer; a member of the Board of Selectmen of Nantucket, Massachusetts and as a member of the Massachusetts House of Representatives.

Early life and education

Paddack was born to Alexander Coleman and Eunice (Hussey) Paddack on Nantucket, Massachusetts on April 2, 1838  Paddack was educated in the public schools of Nantucket, and Nantucket High School.

Business career
Henry Paddack ran a paint supply store at 12 Main Street, Nantucket, Massachusetts.

Political offices
From 1878 to 1881 Paddack was a member of the Massachusetts House of Representatives. In 1892 Paddack was elected the Treasurer of the Town and County of Nantucket, Massachusetts he served as treasurer for eleven consecutive years, Paddack also served as a member of the Nantucket Board of Selectmen for ten years.

Family life
On July 21, 1861 Paddack married Sarah Jane Whippey.  They had one child, Arthur Paddack, born on August 19, 1863.

See also
 1878 Massachusetts legislature

References

1838 births
Republican Party members of the Massachusetts House of Representatives
People from Nantucket, Massachusetts
1920 deaths